"Rock 'n' Roll Star" is a song by English rock band Oasis. It is the opening track from their debut album, Definitely Maybe (1994). Like the majority of the band's songs from this era, it was written by lead guitarist Noel Gallagher, who said that "Rock 'n' Roll Star" was one of only three songs in which he wanted to say something: "I've pretty much summed up everything I wanted to say in "Rock 'n' Roll Star", "Live Forever" and "Cigarettes & Alcohol", after that I'm repeating myself, but in a different way".

It was released as a radio single in America. The song's video, directed by Nigel Dick, consists of clips of the band performing the song from their Live by the Sea gig at Southend-on-Sea, interspersed with clips of them, filming each other, on Southend Pier, in and around the amusement park, 'Adventure Island' then named 'Peter Pan's Playground' and in the bowling alley, which subsequently burnt down.

The song was featured on the band's 2000 live album and DVD, Familiar to Millions; another live version was recorded at a 2 July 2005 concert at the City of Manchester Stadium and released on the band's single "Let There Be Love" in late 2005.

Liam Gallagher performed the song as part of the One Love Manchester charity concert on 4 June 2017 in aid of those affected by the Manchester Arena bombing.

British indie electropop band Kero Kero Bonito released a cover of the song in September 2017, reinterpreting the song as a dance-pop track.

Critical reception
Steve Baltin from Cash Box picked the song as Pick of the Week, writing, "If any one song from their debut CD, Definitely Maybe, shows why Oasis have received the warm response they have from American audiences, this is the track. Against a wild but infectious backbeat, singer Liam Gallagher captures the fantasy of adolescents everywhere. Yet, this is more than a dream, it's a statement we will make the fantasy come true. With their dazzling updating of the great pop hooks of the '60s, Oasis are well on their way to reaching the stardom they sing about. Look for this one to be a tremendously effective follow-up to “Live Forever” on Modern Rock outlets everywhere, with selected AOR stations realizing the joy of this track as well. This is what pop music should be."

Personnel
Liam Gallagher – lead vocals, tambourine
Noel Gallagher – lead guitars, backing vocals
Paul McGuigan – bass
Paul Arthurs – rhythm guitar
Tony McCarroll – drums

Charts

Certifications

References

Oasis (band) songs
1994 songs
1995 singles
Music videos directed by Nigel Dick
Songs written by Noel Gallagher
Song recordings produced by Noel Gallagher
Song recordings produced by Liam Gallagher
Music television series theme songs